Namtumbo District is one of the five districts of the Ruvuma Region of Tanzania.  It is bordered to the north by the Morogoro Region, to the east by the Tunduru District, to the south by Mozambique and to the west by the Songea Urban District and Songea Rural District.

, the population of the Namtumbo District was 185,131.

Wards

The Namtumbo District is administratively divided into 21 wards:

 Kitanda
 Ligera
 Luchili
 Luegu
 Lusewa
 Magazini
Msisima
 Mgombasi
 Mkongo Nakawale
 Msindo
 Namabengo
 Namtumbo
 Rwinga
Mchomoro
Hanga
Mputa
Likuyuseka
Lisimonji
Mkongo Gulioni
Litola
Limamu
Suluti
Mtonya
Nambecha
Mtwaro pachani

Notbale persons from Namtumbo District
 Rashid Kawawa, First Tanzanian Prime Minister

Notes

Districts of Ruvuma Region